Progressive Slovakia (PS) is a liberal and social-liberal political party in Slovakia established in 2017. The party is led by European Parliament vice-president Michal Šimečka. The party is led by Vice President of the European Parliament Michal Šimečka. It is a member of the Renew Europe group and is a full member of the Alliance of Liberals and Democrats for Europe Party. PS has three MEPs: Michal Šimečka (former journalist and researcher), Martin Hojsík, and Michal Wiezik (both environmental activists); Wiezik left the EPP group and Spolu to join PS. Zuzana Čaputová, incumbent President of Slovakia, co-founder and former deputy leader of Progressive Slovakia, was nominated by the party in the 2019 Slovak presidential election, and won by standing for the anti-corruption, environmental and pro-European program. In the National Council, it is represented by deputy Tomáš Valášek elected for For the People, which he left in 2021. In local politics, PS has a dominant position in Bratislava, cooperating with Team Bratislava and Freedom and Solidarity.

History
The party was registered with the Slovak Interior Ministry on 27 November 2017, after the submission of 13,500 signatures. The party's founding congress was held on 20 January 2018, which resulted in  being elected as the party's chairman. Štefunko views the left–right political spectrum as obsolete, instead aiming for the party to be a centrist and liberal political movement, claiming that "Slovakia is full of people who want a modern, open and European country". However, Štefunko stepped down as the party's leader in 2019 following criticism of his past involvement in business and politics, although the official reasoning for his resignation was due to health issues. Štefunko was replaced by former deputy leader . Truban is an IT professional, an entrepreneur, and an anti-corruption activist, who also favors digitalization of governance and bureaucracy.

The party first gained attention in 2018 when its favored candidate, Matúš Vallo, won the 2018 municipal elections in Bratislava, and subsequently became the city's mayor. After the 2019 presidential election, the victory of Progressive Slovakia's presidential candidate, 45-year-old lawyer Zuzana Čaputová, was hailed by international media commentators as a victory of liberalism over right-wing populism. According to Professor Michael Rossi, Čaputová's popularity is related to her appeal as an outsider amidst frustration over political corruption and clientelism among the electorate. Čaputová first gained fame as a campaigner against a toxic waste dump created by real estate brokers who were connected to the ruling Smer-SD, which led to many commentators describing her as the "Slovak Erin Brockovich". While campaigning for the presidency, Čaputová focused on the issues of corruption, inflation, justice, the environment, and overhaul of healthcare, and ran on the slogan "stand up to evil". She stayed silent on the issue of immigration and open borders, which most Slovaks are opposed to, and was the only major candidate not to condemn the Global Compact on Migration. 

The party also got the highest share in the 2019 European Parliament election in Slovakia, earning over 20.1% of the vote and becoming the largest party represented in the Slovak section of the European Parliament, with the establishment Direction – Social Democracy's 15.7% and the neo-fascist Kotleba – People's Party Our Slovakia's 12.1%. For the 2020 parliamentary election, Progressive Slovakia signed a cooperation agreement and non-aggression pact with former president Andrej Kiska's extra-parliamentary For the People party and the Christian Democratic Movement. However on election day, in rather stunning fashion, the PS/Spolu coalition narrowly missed on entering the National Council after finishing with 6.96% of the vote, as coalitions must reach a threshold of 7% in order to enter parliament.

Ideology 
Progressive Slovakia was described as social-liberal and liberal. The party is socially progressive, holding culturally liberal views and is pro-European. PS is economically liberal and occasionally called neo-liberal.

PS was positioned as centrist or centre-left. Despite this the party is generally associated with the Slovak centre-right with the majority of their voters seen themselves as "right-wing" and they have an overlapping voter base with the conservative Ordinary People and Independent Personalities (OĽaNO), centre-right For the People and libertarian Freedom and Solidarity.

The party refuses to cooperate with nationalist and populist parties, such as Direction – Slovak Social Democracy, Slovak National Party, Republic, and People's Party Our Slovakia. Additionally, due to alleged corruption, Progressive Slovakia also rejects collaboration with Voice – Social Democracy and with the conservative We Are Family.

European representation 

In the European Parliament, Progressive Slovakia sits in the Renew Europe group with two MEPs. The party joined the Alliance of Liberals and Democrats for Europe Party in November 2018.

In the European Committee of the Regions, Progressive Slovakia sits in the Renew Europe CoR group with one full member for the 2020-2025 mandate.

Election results

National Council

European Parliament

Presidential

Party leaders

See also 
 Politics of Slovakia
 List of political parties in Slovakia

Notes

References

External links
Official website

2017 establishments in Slovakia
Political parties established in 2017
Centrist parties in Slovakia
Pro-European political parties in Slovakia
Liberal parties in Slovakia